The 2012–13 season was Sepahan's 12th season in the Pro League, and their 19th consecutive season in the top division of Iranian Football and 60th year in existence as a football club. They also competed in the Hazfi Cup and AFC Champions League. Sepahan was captained by Moharram Navidkia.

Player

First team squad
Last updated on 11 May 2013

For more on the reserve and academy squads, see Sepahan Novin.

Iran Pro League squad
Updated 19 January 2013.

For recent transfers, see List of Iranian football transfers winter 2012–13.

Transfers 
Confirmed transfers 2012–13

Summer 

In:

Out:

Winter 

In:

Out:

Competitions

Overview

Iran Pro League

Standings

Results summary

Results by round

Matches

Hazfi Cup

Matches

AFC Champions League 2012

Quarter-finals

AFC Champions League 2013

Group stage

Friendly Matches

Statistics

Appearances 
Last updated on 11 May 2013

|}

Apps: x+y+z, where x means full match (90-minute) appearance, y means match starting appearance and then exchanged, z means appearance as the exchange player in the middle of the match.

Goal scorers
Includes all competitive matches. The list is sorted by shirt number when total goals are equal.

Last updated on 11 May 2013

Friendlies and Pre-season goals are not recognized as competitive match goals.

Disciplinary record
Includes all competitive matches. Players with 1 card or more included only.

Last updated on 11 May 2013

Goals conceded 
Last updated on 11 May 2013

Own goals 
Last updated on 11 May 2013

Total minutes played 
Last updated on 11 May 2013

Overall statistics
Last updated on 11 May 2013

Club

Coaching staff

|}

Other personnel

Grounds

|}

See also
 2012 AFC Champions League
 2013 AFC Champions League
 2012–13 Persian Gulf Cup
 2012–13 Hazfi Cup

References

External links
Iran Premier League Statistics
Persian League

Sepahan S.C. seasons
Sepahan